Live & Kicking is a British children's television series that originally aired on BBC1 from 2 October 1993 to 15 September 2001. It was the replacement for Going Live!, and took many of its features from it, such as phone-ins, games, comedy, competitions and the showing of cartoons. Once Live & Kicking had become established in series two, it reached its height in popularity during series four, when it was presented by Zoe Ball and Jamie Theakston; their final edition won a BAFTA award. After this the programme's ratings dropped with the launch of SMTV Live on ITV and the show ended in 2001.

History
Live & Kicking was conceived as a replacement for Going Live!. It was first broadcast on 2 October 1993 at 9 am on BBC1. The original hosts were Andi Peters, Emma Forbes who had presented a cookery segment in Going Live!, and John Barrowman. For the second series, Barrowman was relegated to hosting the showbiz Electric Circus segment, leaving Peters and Forbes to become the main hosts. He left after one series of Electric Circus to concentrate on acting. Comedy duo Trevor and Simon and Peter Simon, in the Run the Risk segment, were also regulars who had featured on Going Live!.

While the first series was not as popular as its predecessor, the second series was more successful. It was broadcast during the winter months, from September to April, with Fully Booked replacing it during the summer. New episodes of the Rugrats were shown. The series went out opposite ITV's What's Up Doc? but during its third series issues were raised by the ITC, and a number of people left including Don Austen and John Eccleston (Bro and Bro's puppeteers) who defected to Live & Kicking to star as a couple of leprechaun brothers Sage and Onion.

Andi Peters decided to leave the programme in 1996, after being offered an executive role at LWT, where he also presented Saturday mid-morning music programme The Noise. Emma Forbes initially planned to continue, but during the programme's summer break she also decided to leave, after finding out she was pregnant.

They were replaced by Zoë Ball and Jamie Theakston, who presented it for three years. According to the BBC, the show's popularity was at its peak during the 1996/1997 series when the show regularly had 2.5 million viewers. Around this time Mr. Blobby, played by Barry Killerby, also appeared on the series.

After three years, Ball decided to move on due to a hectic schedule, and Theakston followed. The final episode hosted by Ball and Theakston later won the show a children's BAFTA award for Best Entertainment show in November 1999.

The show returned in Autumn 1999 with new presenters Emma Ledden and Steve Wilson,. They only lasted for one series, because ratings dropped to 1.6 million during their tenure. At the same time rival SMTV Live on competitor channel ITV was relaunched to feature more comedic elements and its innuendo and features began to gain popularity. Fully Booked, the BBC's summer replacement, was also revamped and retitled as FBi, but ratings continued to drop. The following October, the programme was completely revamped, with a line-up of four: Ortis Deley, Katy Hill, Trey Farley and Sarah Cawood.

Ratings continued to plummet, because of the continuing success of SMTV Live. In an unprecedented move, in March 2001 the BBC extended the series over the summer, like SMTV was broadcast, but announced it would end in the autumn. Hill was replaced by Heather Suttie as the show was moved to BBC Scotland on 21 April until 15 September 2001 when the final show aired. It was replaced by The Saturday Show, which continued to be broadcast all year round.

Format
Live & Kicking was a weekly magazine show broadcast every Saturday morning, from late September or early October to April and in Series 8, it was broadcast from October to September. It was aimed at young people. It featured music performances, "hot seat" questions for celebrity guests, phone-ins, games, comedy sketches, competitions, and television programmes and cartoons. It used the taglines "Miss it, miss out" and "The only way to start your weekend" on promotional adverts for the show. As well as the main presenters, there were regulars such as comedy duo Trevor and Simon, and later Ben, Gez and Rich from The Cheese Shop and SuperGirly. A segment in the first few series that was an adaptation of Going Live's Double Dare was Run the Risk, a game in which teams of children completed various obstacle courses and challenges. Gunge was often included to make the tasks harder. Run The Risk was later broadcast separately. From 1994 until 2000, there was a showbiz segment called the Electric Circus, which featured the latest films, music, computer games and gossip. It was first presented by John Barrowman after he stepped aside as a regular presenter, and was later hosted by a variety of people.

The first series featured the computerised head of a cat named "Ratz" announcing links, but this was dropped after one series. It was replaced by human announcer Mitch Johnson, who, as well as providing commentary and links for each item, would interact with both the audience and the presenters too. From the second series, two puppet leprechauns, later named as Sage and Onion, became regulars. They were played by Don Austen and John Eccleston, and were designed and built by Darryl Worbey Studios. They performed comedy sketches throughout the morning, and often interacted with the people in the studio. Another comedy character who first appeared in the third series was Mr Blobby, who had previously appeared in Noel's House Party. Most regular features were dropped for the final series, when the show was revamped. A feature that stuck throughout was the jingle for the phone number, first 081 811 8181, then 0181 811 8181, then 0845 610 1515.

As well as the television show, Live and Kicking launched a music CD, composed of the best music that artists had sung live on the programme. A video game called Live and Kicking: Showmaker was also created, where the user could combine elements of the show to create their own television production on a small scale. A monthly magazine was also produced, though sales of the magazine dropped significantly towards the end of Live & Kicking'''s production, reflecting its loss of viewers.

For series five and six, there was a short version of the show that aired on Friday afternoons called L&K Friday, but this was cancelled after two series. The regular Saturday presenters Jamie Theakston and Zoe Ball presented the first series, and Steve Wilson and Liz Fraser presented the second series. A 90-minute version of the show also aired on BBC Choice and was entitled L&K Replay.

In May 2000, two months before Wilson and Ledden officially resigned from Live & Kicking, the show was brought back for a one-off special during the summer break. It was to mix in with the BBC's Music Live and the show was titled as Music Live & Kicking with Wilson and Ledden returning to present along with future presenter Ortis Deley and special guest presenter Stephen Gately of Boyzone. This special was dedicated to a series of music performances (hence the title) and was the first edition to be broadcast in widescreen.

One of the last features was L&K Castaway, a spin-off of the BBC reality show Castaway 2000. Each week, six children would spend four days on a remote Scottish island, learning how to survive, among other skills. Points were earned through passing various tasks, and were lost if contestants entered the "Temptation Hut", which contained various modern electrical appliances.

Overview
Live & Kicking began on 2 October 1993 and saw the introduction of presenters Andi Peters, Emma Forbes and John Barrowman. Trev and Simon also joined them and provided the comedy for the show; both had also been on the former show Going Live! with Forbes. Two leprechaun puppets made their debut in 1995, both of which would later be named in a viewers' competition as 'Sage and Onion'. Both Mr Sage and Mr Onion were created by Darryl Worbey Studios and were operated by Don Austen and John Eccleston, had previously been the puppeteers of the wolves 'Bro & Bro' on ITV's What's Up Doc?

The computer game for the 1995 series was called Snuffle the Truffles and involved viewers guiding a pig character around a pigpen eating truffles, whilst Trev and Simon invited two guests to review videos in the Video Galleon. The last show before the programme went on a summer break in 1996 saw Peters and Forbes leave the show. The programme returned in September 1996 with the introduction of new presenters Zoë Ball and Jamie Theakston, and an array of new features.

Its return in 1997 saw the replacement of the white set with a new one that maintained the same shape and layout, but was curvier and larger. This coincided with the show moving into the larger Studio 6. This series also saw the introduction of Ben Ward, Richard Webb and Gerard Foster (known as Ben, Gez and Rich) of The Cheese Shop who took over the comedy from 'Trev and Simon'. The computer game for this series became Grabbit Rabbit which involved guiding 'Warren the Rabbit' down a course collecting carrots whilst dodging obstacles such as fences and bushes. Ball later said in an interview that Blake Harrison of The Inbetweeners had told her that he had once been a player on Grabbit Rabbit when he was younger.

In September 1998 Live & Kicking began with the leprechaun Mr Onion being temporarily written out of the show after supposedly being swept down the plughole in the bath. This was done intentionally as puppeteer John Eccleston was in Australia filming for Farscape and would not be available. To compensate for Eccleston's absence, a new leprechaun puppet was added called 'Shamrock' (voiced by Rebecca Nagan of Rosie and Jim fame). On 3 October 1998, future Harry Potter star Daniel Radcliffe also appeared in the audience during The Hot Seat item where he proceeded to ask The Chuckle Brothers a question. The final edition before the programme went on a summer break also saw the departure of Ball and Theakston as hosts and featured them both in The Hot Seat being interviewed by Michael Parkinson about their time on the show. This episode later went on to win a Children's BAFTA in November 1999.

Live & Kicking returned in September 1999 and saw the introduction of new presenters Steve Wilson and Emma Ledden. New features were added however unlike previous series, many of them failed to last and were continuously replaced. It also saw leprechaun Mr Onion return, however Shamrock remained meaning the show now had three leprechaun puppets. A new comedy duo called Supergirly were also introduced from January 2000 to fill the gap left by 'Ben, Gez and Rich' who had quit the show the previous series. Supergirly, which consisted of Louise McClatchy and Jai Simeone, (known as Lou and Jai) would feature in sketches throughout the morning as BBC make-up artists who were rude to the guests.

October 2000 saw a number of major changes to the show. The set was entirely revamped with a new layout, new titles were added along with a new arrangement of the theme tune. Mr Blobby, The Leprechauns, Supergirly, Renoir and Mitch had also been removed from the show and unlike previous series, there were now four presenters instead of two: Katy Hill, Ortis Deley, Trey Farley and Sarah Cawood. The programme also saw the introduction of gunge based games. A new game was also introduced on the roof of BBC Television Centre called Sacrifice Your Family which Cawood hosted that put two families against each other in various games.

From 21 April 2001, Live & Kicking began broadcasting from BBC Scotland in Glasgow and saw Farley, Cawood and Deley joined by Heather Suttie who replaced Hill. The last show on 15 September 2001 saw many of the old features and presenters return, including leprechauns Mr Sage and Mr Onion, who acknowledged in the final few minutes of the show that they were the longest serving presenters of the show. The final edition ended with a montage of the series' best moments over a live performance of the Steps song "It's The Way You Make Me Feel".

Demise and replacement
The Ball and Theakston series are considered to be when Live & Kicking was at its peak in popularity. After their final series in 1999, they were replaced by new presenters Emma Ledden and Steve Wilson. Ledden and Wilson did not know each other at the start of the series, and so there was none of the interaction between them, as seen between Ball and Theakston. Additionally, SMTV Live which broadcast opposite on ITV was slowly becoming more popular, and gaining the audience the BBC was losing. After just one series, Ledden and Wilson's contracts were not renewed.

Wilson later said that they were dropped just as they were starting to form a relationship, and that Ant & Dec, presenters of SMTV Live, had the edge over them as they had known each other much longer. Ledden had already been dropped when Wilson went through several meetings with the BBC. He decided it was better to leave after one good series, rather than do a second "lame" series, and went on to appear in rival SMTV Live's 100th show, in the Friends skit, 'Chums'. When Live & Kicking returned in October 2000, it was completely revamped, with brand new titles and a line-up of four presenters.

However, this did nothing to increase viewing figures, and the chemistry between the presenters was even less apparent. It was decided not to end the show in April and replace it with a summer show, because the replacement FBi had lost even more viewers for the BBC. Live & Kicking continued until September after a move to Glasgow where the summer show had normally been filmed. 
Just before the move it was announced it would be the final series. The principal reason given for the decision was the increasing loss of viewers to SMTV Live, which had a similar format and was more successful. Live and Kicking was replaced by The Saturday Show, fronted by Dani Behr and Joe Mace, which was shown all year round until September 2003 when it began an Autumn-Spring/Summer loop with Dick and Dom in da Bungalow.Live & Kicking was featured in the BBC's It Started with Swap Shop programme in 2006, in which Noel Edmonds interviewed the first pair of presenters, Andi Peters and Emma Forbes, about their time on the show.

Production
For the first four series, Live & Kicking broadcast from TC 7 at BBC Television Centre however as of Series 5, it moved next door into TC 6 where it gained a larger set due to it being a larger studio. On 14 April 2001, the final show from TC 6 at BBC Television Centre was broadcast before the show moved to 'Studio A' in BBC Scotland the following week, which at the time, was based on Queen Margaret Drive, Glasgow. It then remained there until the end of its run.

Studio A at Queen Margaret Drive has since been demolished following the BBC's move to new studios at Pacific Quay in 2007. Property developer David Wilson Homes are currently building new homes called The Botanics on the site of the old Live & Kicking studio.

Studios TC 6 and TC 7 at BBC Television Centre also suffered a similar fate in 2015 when they too were demolished in the restructure of the building. As such, none of the studios used by Live & Kicking exist anymore.

 After Live & Kicking 
On Friday 16 November 2001, two months after the show had finished, parts of the old Live & Kicking set from Series 8 were resurrected and reused as part of BBC Scotland's regional studio set for BBC Children in Need. In an attempt to disguise the set's former use, all traces of L&K branding were removed and replaced with Children In Need logos and throughout the course of the evening, the old gunge tank, beanbag seating area and performance stage were reused one more time.

In 2004, former presenters Katy Hill and Trey Farley, who had presented the show together in Series 8, went on to marry each other at a register office in Surrey before flying to Tuscany to seal their marriage. They later had two children together- a daughter called 'Kaya Skye' born in 2006 and a son called 'Akira' born in 2007.

In 2009, Zoë Ball and Jamie Theakston who had presented the programme together between 1996 and 1999, were reunited to present a new game show for Channel 5 called Britain's Best Brain'' which ran from 28 October to 16 December 2009.

Transmissions

References

External links

Live & Kicking at Saturday Mornings
Live & Kicking on Paul Morris' SatKids

1990s British children's television series
2000s British children's television series
1993 British television series debuts
2001 British television series endings
BBC children's television shows
BBC Scotland television shows
English-language television shows
British television shows featuring puppetry
Television series featuring gunge